Martin "The Savage" Savidge (born May 27, 1958) is a Canadian-American television news correspondent.

Savidge worked for NBC News and was a special correspondent and former anchor for public television's Worldfocus nightly news program in the role of a special correspondent. He previously worked for WJW, Cleveland, where he also worked with current NBC correspondent Kelly O'Donnell. Savidge began anchoring CNN Newsroom in January 2011.

Biography
Savidge was born in Lachine, Quebec, Canada to British parents, who soon after moved to the United States.  He holds dual citizenship for both Canada and the United States.  Savidge grew up in Rocky River, Ohio and graduated from Rocky River High School in 1976. He studied theater at Beck Center for the Arts in Lakewood, Ohio. Savidge earned a bachelor's degree in journalism from Ohio University in 1981.

Savidge's early career in journalism included a stint at WCIA in Champaign, Illinois and prime time anchor for WMBD-TV in Peoria, Illinois. He interned at WKYC, and reported for the Associated Press. In September 1984, Savidge joined WJW-TV (then WJKW-TV), where he won nine Emmy Awards, five in Savidge's final year at the station. One Emmy-winning special examined the background of D-Day, and was inspired by his father Earnest, who served in the Royal Navy during World War II. Despite being a local reporter, Savidge's datelines while at WJW-TV included Vietnam, Russia, and Ukraine.

In 1996, he was hired by CNN. Savidge would still be a field reporter, but he would spend more time as anchor.

Savidge joined NBC News in March 2004, but remained in Atlanta. In 2005, Savidge reported for NBC News in New Orleans, Louisiana, when Hurricane Katrina struck the Gulf Coast. After Katrina, he helped, as head correspondent, open an NBC News bureau in New Orleans. He regularly gave reports about improvements and stories after Katrina.

In October 2008, Savidge left full-time work at NBC to be the anchor of Worldfocus, an American newscast focusing on international news.

On 13 January 2009, Savidge began hosting a weekly radio show on BlogTalkRadio. The 30-minute talk show is focused on international news and includes a panel of guests.

On 28 August 2009, Savidge announced on the program that Daljit Dhaliwal would be taking over his role on Worldfocus, although he would still host one week a month and have an opportunity to "step out from behind the desk".

Savidge returned to CNN in 2009 as a freelancer. In March 2011, he again became a CNN staffer. On December 1, 2022, it was announced he was let go from CNN, along with numerous other CNN personalities.

Awards
Savidge's awards include:
 Two Headliner Awards
 Two Edward R. Murrow Awards
 A Peabody Award
 A duPont-Columbia Award
 Six Associated Press Awards
 Two United Press Intl. Awards
 Nine local Emmy awards
 2002 "Media Person of the Year" (from the National Journalism Education Association)

References

External links
About Martin Savidge from the  Worldfocus website, September 11, 2008
Martin Savidge - Biography from NBC Nightly News

1958 births
Living people
People from Lachine, Quebec
Rocky River High School (Ohio) alumni
Ohio University alumni
American television reporters and correspondents
Television anchors from Cleveland
NBC News people
CNN people